Jesús Alberto Rubio Arribas (born 25 January 1992 in Tomelloso) is a Spanish cyclist, who last rode for UCI Continental team .

Major results
2016
 1st Circuit d'Alger
 2nd Overall Tour de Constantine
1st Stage 2
 2nd Critérium International d'Alger
 7th Overall Tour Internationale d'Annaba

References

External links

1992 births
Living people
Spanish male cyclists
Sportspeople from the Province of Ciudad Real
Cyclists from Castilla-La Mancha